The Schijenflue is a mountain in the Rätikon range of the Alps, located on the border between Austria and Switzerland.

A day or multiday hike that follows the whole of the Rätikon chain and passes Schijenflue on its sunny side is called "Prättigauer Höhenweg".

References

External links
 Schijenflue on Hikr

Mountains of the Alps
Mountains of Switzerland
Mountains of Vorarlberg
Austria–Switzerland border
International mountains of Europe
Mountains of Graubünden
Two-thousanders of Switzerland
Luzein